The ARIA Music Award for Song of the Year (Songwriter) was an award presented at the annual ARIA Music Awards, which recognises "the many achievements of Aussie artists across all music genres", since 1987. It was awarded by the Australian Recording Industry Association (ARIA), an organisation whose aim is "to advance the interests of the Australian record industry."

Song of the Year (Songwriter) was given as an industry voted award from 1987 until 1998, when it was discontinued. Crowded House won the award twice, making them the most awarded artists in the category.

The ARIA Award for Single of the Year was renamed to Song of the Year in 2012.

Winners and nominees
In the following table, the winner is highlighted in a separate colour, and boldface; the nominees are those that are not highlighted or in boldface. All reliable sources used in this article make no mention of other nominees for the year 1987.

References

External links
 The ARIA Awards Official website

S
A